Leah Marlee Pells (born November 9, 1964 in Vancouver, British Columbia) is a retired female track and field athlete from Canada who competed in the middle distance events and was once ranked first in the world in the 1500 metres. She represented Canada at three consecutive Summer Olympics from 1992 to 2000.  Pells finished fourth in the 1500 metre race in Atlanta.  Pells won the silver medal in the women's 1500 metres at the 1999 Pan American Games in Winnipeg.

Pells published her autobiography Not About the Medal in 2012. In the book, she writes about being the daughter of an alcoholic, experiencing abuse and growing up impoverished.

Pells has one son and now works as a trained counsellor.

See also
 Canadian records in track and field

References

External links
 
 
 
 
 
 

1964 births
Living people
Canadian female middle-distance runners
Athletes (track and field) at the 1992 Summer Olympics
Athletes (track and field) at the 1996 Summer Olympics
Athletes (track and field) at the 2000 Summer Olympics
Athletes (track and field) at the 1999 Pan American Games
Athletes (track and field) at the 1990 Commonwealth Games
Athletes (track and field) at the 1994 Commonwealth Games
Athletes (track and field) at the 1998 Commonwealth Games
Olympic track and field athletes of Canada
Commonwealth Games competitors for Canada
Pan American Games track and field athletes for Canada
Pan American Games silver medalists for Canada
World Athletics Championships athletes for Canada
Athletes from Vancouver
People from Coquitlam
Pan American Games medalists in athletics (track and field)
Medalists at the 1999 Pan American Games